Sandra Lee "Sandy" Scheuer (August 11, 1949 – May 4, 1970) was a student at Kent State University in Kent, Ohio, when she was killed by Ohio National Guardsmen in the Kent State shootings.

Background
Scheuer was born in Youngstown, Ohio, the daughter of Sarah (Lacko) and Martin Scheuer. She had an older sister, Audrey. She was Jewish. She was an honors student in speech therapy, and was a graduate of Boardman High School. She did not take part in the Vietnam War protests that preceded the shootings. She was shot in the neck with an M-1 rifle from a distance of 130 yards (119 m) while walking between classes. The bullet severed her jugular vein and she died within five or six minutes from loss of blood. According to the account of her boyfriend Bruce Burkland, Scheuer "was walking with one of her speech and hearing therapy students across the green. Caught in the gunfire, neither Sandra nor the young man had anything to do with the assembly of students on the green." Three other unarmed students were also killed in the shootings: Allison Krause, Jeffrey Miller, and William Knox Schroeder.

The shootings led to protests and a national student strike, causing hundreds of campuses to close because of both violent and non-violent demonstrations. The Kent State campus remained closed for six weeks. Five days after the shootings, 100,000 people demonstrated in Washington, D.C., against the war.

Scheuer had been a member of the Alpha Xi Delta sorority, and current members of this sorority speak in her memory each year on the Kent State University campus at the May 4 Task Force's commemoration of the 1970 tragedy.

In 2018 an exhibit in memory of Scheuer called "Sandy's Scrapbook," based on an actual scrapbook she kept while attending Kent State, opened at the University's May 4 Visitor Center.

In popular culture

Just after Scheuer's death, the English songwriter Harvey Andrews composed a song titled "Hey Sandy", whose lyrics are addressed to her:

In the song "Ohio", which was written immediately after the shootings, folk rocker Neil Young made a reference to Scheuer in the chorus:

Scheuer is also remembered in Canadian poet Gary Geddes' poem "Sandra Lee Scheuer", found in his 1980 collection The Acid Test. An image of a memorial to Scheuer was included in the CD case to The Argument (2001) by Fugazi.

References

Further reading
 Jedick, Peter (2006). "Rawls' Death Brings Back Sad Memory." Plain Dealer (Cleveland, Ohio), February 13, 2006, D3.

External links
 
Sandy Scheuer: May 4 Archive

1949 births
1970 deaths
American people of the Vietnam War
20th-century American Jews
Kent State University alumni
Kent State shootings
People from Youngstown, Ohio
Deaths by firearm in Ohio